Helicia grayi, also named Gray's silky oak, is a species of rainforest trees, of northeastern Queensland, Australia, from the flowering plant family Proteaceae.

They are endemic to the northern upland rainforests of the Wet Tropics region, from about  altitude.

 this species has the official, current, Queensland government conservation status of "near threatened" species.

References

grayi
Proteales of Australia
Flora of Queensland